Lieutenant Colonel John Sheppard, USAF is a fictional character in the 2004 Canadian-American military science fiction television series Stargate Atlantis, which chronicles a civilian operation exploring the Pegasus Galaxy via a network of alien transportation devices. Portrayed by Joe Flanigan, Sheppard holds the military rank of lieutenant colonel in the series and is the second-in-command of the Atlantis Expedition following the death of Marshall Sumner (Robert Patrick) in "Rising".

Sheppard and Rodney McKay (David Hewlett) are the only characters to appear in all one hundred episodes of the series.

Role in Stargate Atlantis

Character arc 
John Sheppard was an experienced and a talented US Air Force Officer in Afghanistan, though his reputation was somewhat tarnished when he disobeyed a direct order in an unsuccessful attempt to save the lives of several US servicemen. When called upon to transport Brigadier General Jack O'Neill to the research base that had been established at the nearby Ancient defense facility, he inadvertently discovered that he not only had the ATA gene (the genetic factor necessary to activate Ancient technology), but that he was naturally proficient at using it. After some doubts, he finally joined the expedition to Atlantis, although Colonel Marshall Sumner made it clear he was not pleased about Sheppard's involvement in the mission.

After they discovered that the shield protecting the underwater city of Atlantis was about to collapse, he joined the mission team searching for a new power source on Athos on Elizabeth Weir's orders. He made a better impression on the Athosian leader, Teyla Emmagan. Sheppard then killed the Wraith Keeper, thus awakening all the other hungry Wraith that were sleeping. After retreating with a Puddle Jumper along with other military personnel and rescued Athosians they returned safely to Atlantis.

Aside from being the ranking military officer, Sheppard led an exploration team that consisted of Dr. Rodney McKay, Emmagan and Lt. Aiden Ford. After Ford became addicted to the Wraith enzyme and left Atlantis, Ronon Dex joined the team. Sheppard's relaxed command style often put him at odds with his more, by-the-book chief of security, Sergeant Bates, until Bates was severely injured after an attack by a Wraith. During the Wraith attack on Atlantis, Sheppard lost command of the military after the arrival of Colonel Dillon Everett from Stargate Command (SGC).

After securing Atlantis, the Daedalus took Sheppard, Weir, McKay and Carson Beckett back to Earth to report on the status of the Atlantis expedition. General Hank Landry implied to Weir that the Pentagon wanted to make Colonel Steven Caldwell the military commander of the Atlantis expedition, but Weir informed them that Atlantis already had a military commander. When they stated that Sheppard was just a major with a questionable record, she told them that they could solve that problem with the President and the International Oversight Committee on her side; Sheppard was subsequently promoted to the rank of lieutenant colonel and installed as official military commander of the Atlantis expedition. Colonel Caldwell, who had sought the leadership position, was displeased by this outcome.

While testing a new "Gate bridge" that McKay and Lt. Colonel Samantha Carter created to accelerate transportation between Pegasus and the Milky Way, an Ancient ship was located, filled with living Ancients who reclaimed Atlantis. With the expedition disbanded, Sheppard was assigned command of an SG team. When General O'Neill sent a message to Stargate Command telling them that the Asurans had taken control of Atlantis, Sheppard, Weir, McKay, and Beckett hijacked a puddle jumper and traveled back to the Pegasus via the Gate Bridge. They tracked down Emmagan and Dex; the newly reunited team succeeded in rescuing O'Neill and Richard Woolsey and retook Atlantis. In the episode Adrift, Sheppard was forced to take command of Atlantis, since Weir was in a coma due to injuries that she sustained after Atlantis was grazed by the Replicator's beam. Sheppard later lost Weir during a mission to the Replicator homeworld in a successful effort to save Atlantis and turn the Replicators against the Wraith.

After piloting Atlantis to a new home, Sheppard fell under the command of Colonel Samantha Carter, the new leader of Atlantis. He acted as her second-in-command during the war with the Replicators, a war which reunited him with the Wraith he later named "Todd." Thanks to a brilliant plan by McKay, the Replicators were destroyed by an alliance of Wraith and human forces, but a new threat emerged in the form of the former Wraith, Michael, who kidnapped Teyla. After rescuing Teyla and apparently killing Michael, Sheppard encountered a new change of command as Richard Woolsey took over Atlantis.

Under Woolsey, Sheppard continued to lead efforts to fight the Wraith and Michael, who returned a final time to takeover Atlantis. With the help of Todd, Sheppard and his team attempted to find a way to eliminate the Wraith's need to feed on humans, but this led to a betrayal by Todd when he believed that Sheppard activated the Attero Device to destroy the Wraith at the cost of any activated Stargate in the Pegasus Galaxy. Despite this, Sheppard continued working with Todd when the situation called for it. In the series finale, Enemy at the Gate, Sheppard learned about a new, more powerful hive ship from Todd and worked to stop it from reaching and destroying Earth. When all else failed, even Atlantis, Sheppard boarded the ship with a nuclear weapon in a suicide mission to save Earth. Sheppard succeeded in destroying the hive ship and saving Atlantis and Earth, but, due to a surprise appearance by the rest of his team, survived the experience. He later joined Atlantis' senior staff as they looked out over the Golden Gate Bridge from Atlantis, which had landed on Earth in the aftermath of the hive ship's attempted attack.

John Sheppard learns how to fly a Wraith dart in the season 2 episode "The Lost Boys". He later pilots one in "The Hive", "Vengeance" and "Search and Rescue" as a way to escape Wraith ships.

Characterization 
John is one of the more laid-back, easy-going personalities on the Atlantis Expedition. He is capable under pressure, an excellent marksman, and outstanding pilot. He is very instinctual and frequently is able to come up with ingenious solutions to complicated problems. Some put this ability down to his being a closet mathematical genius, despite little scientific training. He also has displayed the ability to keep up with much of Rodney McKay's complicated plans. But despite this, he tends to be relatively humble—being able to accept that sometimes there isn't anything he can do to help to resolve the current problem, and leaving it up to more capable minds.  He has also occasionally shown a darker side; he did not hesitate to take action that killed over 50 Genii soldiers when Kolya was trying to take over the city in The Storm.  He also supported using torture on a former Atlantis colleague to gain information in Critical Mass Also in the episode, Millers Crossing, he talked Henry Wallace, the owner of Devlin Medical Technologies, into sacrificing himself to a Wraith. When McKay voiced his discomfort over this, he replied that he merely presented a situation. He told McKay that the report would only say that the wraith got the upper hand. Sheppard tends to be very honest at times: when he makes a deal, he keeps it, something which is acknowledged by the trust the Wraith, Todd, puts in him when they make deals together. Sheppard demonstrates this when he agrees to spare Todd in order to escape; then, despite having Todd at his mercy, with Todd never actually expecting Sheppard to honor their deal, Sheppard does and releases Todd. When Sheppard later offers Todd a deal in exchange for saving their lives, Todd is dubious until Sheppard gives to Todd his word, at which time Todd stops questioning Sheppard's honesty. Sheppard does keep the deal, convincing a reluctant Richard Woolsey to go along with it.

Despite being a lieutenant colonel, he has an easy rapport with most of the people in Atlantis - including the military personnel that are below him in terms of rank. He is good friends with both Teyla and Ronon, and grudgingly admits that he loves McKay "in the way a friend feels about another friend". And despite occasional clashes with Elizabeth Weir early on (due to their differing viewpoints), they have developed a strong and respectful friendship due, in no small part, to their parallel leadership roles on the Expedition. In the episode Doppelganger it was revealed that the thing he is most afraid of is himself, as well as failing to protect his friends. Though he is a somewhat incurable flirt, he has not yet been shown in an actual relationship. In the episode Sunday, Ronon tells him that Sheppard and Teyla would be good together. Sheppard never answered to Ronon. However, it was later revealed that Sheppard has an ex-wife named Nancy (Kari Wührer).

He is in possession of a rather wry sense of humor, and frequently alleviates tension by telling jokes to keep spirits up - much to the annoyance of McKay. He hates clowns, enjoys Ferris wheels, American football and 'anything that goes faster than 200 miles an hour', along with displaying a vague aptitude for Chess - beating McKay on at least one occasion, once again to McKay's chagrin. Sheppard qualified for  Mensa, (a "high IQ" society), but never joined. Sheppard is an avid golf player and a fan of Johnny Cash. He has also on several occasions referred to the movies Alien by Ridley Scott, Star Trek, Star Wars, and The Abyss. Sheppard also brought the book War and Peace to pass the time, and in episode 50, states he is "Only a quarter of the way through War and Peace."

Sheppard possesses a unique relationship with the Wraith "Todd." The two were initially held prisoner together by Acastus Koyla with Todd being forced to feed on Sheppard to torture him. Sheppard's unfailing belief that they could escape or be rescued convinced Todd to work with him to get out with the deal that if they ever met again "all bets are off." Both kept their ends of the deal: Todd restored the life he stole from Sheppard, something he stated was reserved only for their worshippers and "brothers" and Sheppard took him somewhere he could be found by the Wraith rather than killing him. Despite their deal, Sheppard later agreed to work with Todd on several occasions, even once saying that Todd may be their best chance at defeating the Wraith, but is very distrusting of him. However, Todd, even after betraying Sheppard once, kept coming back to him for help despite repeated death threats and the two seem to have a mutual understanding of each other. In one episode, Sheppard uses his understanding of Todd's personality to convince him to do what he wants. Todd realizes this and states to him "you know how to talk to me," but is amused rather than angry as Sheppard was right. Todd also seems to trust at least Sheppard's word as he has never seriously questioned him when they make a deal which Sheppard always upholds. When Sheppard did so once to the point that it saved Todd's life, the Wraith promised to remember his actions.

Conceptual history
Ben Browder was originally planned to play the part of Sheppard. However, because Browder was busy with Farscape: The Peacekeeper Wars at the time, Joe Flanigan stepped in and took over the role. After Farscape ended, Browder joined Stargate SG-1 and was given the role of SG-1 regular, Cameron Mitchell instead.

References

External links 
 John Sheppard at Stargate wikia
 John Sheppard  at scifi.com

Fictional majors
Fictional lieutenant colonels
Fictional space pilots
Fictional United States Air Force personnel
Fictional Gulf War veterans
Stargate characters
Television characters introduced in 2004
Crossover characters in television